Dionisio Zannettini (died 1566) was a Roman Catholic prelate who served as Bishop of Mylopotamos (1538–1555) and Bishop of Ceos and Thermia (1529–1538).

Biography
Dionisio Zannettini was ordained a priest in the Order of Friars Minor. On 8 Feb 1529, he was appointed during the papacy of Pope Clement VII as Bishop of Ceos and Thermia. On 11 Dec 1538, he was appointed during the papacy of Pope Paul III as Bishop of Mylopotamos. He served as Bishop of Mylopotamos until his resignation in 1555. He died in 1566. While bishop, he was the principal co-consecrator of Alfonso Oliva, Bishop of Bovino (1535) and François Maronus (1535).

References

External links and additional sources
 (for Chronology of Bishops) 
 (for Chronology of Bishops)  

16th-century Roman Catholic bishops in the Republic of Venice
Bishops appointed by Pope Clement VII
Bishops appointed by Pope Paul III
1566 deaths